White Mountain is a mountain in the northern part of Yosemite National Park. White Mountain is near both Mount Conness and Ragged Peak. It is the 18th highest mountain within the park's boundaries.

White Mountain should not be confused with two other similarly named peaks in California: False White Mountain, also in Yosemite, and White Mountain Peak, in the White Mountains of Inyo County and the third-highest mountain in California.

On climbing White Mountain

White Mountain is a  climb.

References

External links and references

 A YouTube, View from the White Mountain next to Mt Conness in Yosemite

Mountains of Yosemite National Park
Mountains of Madera County, California